Stubø is a surname. Notable people with the surname include:

Eirik Stubø (born 1965), Norwegian stage producer and theatre director
Håvard Stubø (born 1977), Norwegian guitarist and composer
Kjersti Stubø (born 1970), Norwegian vocalist
Mathias Stubø (born 1992), Norwegian musician and DJ
Thorgeir Stubø (1943–1986), Norwegian guitarist and composer